is a Japanese politician of the Constitutional Democratic Party of Japan, and a member of the House of Representatives. She is a former member of People's New Party and of the House of Councillors. A native of Tokyo and graduate of Gakushuin University and Carleton University, she was elected for the first time in 2007 in the Shimane at-large district. Her father Hisaoki Kamei was a veteran member of the House of Representatives. She is married.

Kamei contested the Shimane 1st district in 2017 election. While she lost against the longtime incumbent Hiroyuki Hosoda in the race, she received enough votes to be elected through the PR block.

References

External links 
 Official website in Japanese.

Female members of the House of Representatives (Japan)
Members of the House of Representatives (Japan)
Female members of the House of Councillors (Japan)
Members of the House of Councillors (Japan)
Gakushuin University alumni
Carleton University alumni
People from Tokyo
People from Shimane Prefecture
Living people
1965 births
21st-century Japanese politicians
21st-century Japanese women politicians
Constitutional Democratic Party of Japan politicians
People's New Party politicians